Saint-Pol-sur-Mer is a former commune in the Nord department in northern France.  Since 9 December 2010, it is part of the commune of Dunkirk. In 2019 it had 20,250 inhabitants. It is the second-largest suburb of the city of Dunkirk, and is almost encircled by it.

Personalities
 Yannick Kamanan, footballer
 Kristina Mladenovic, tennis player
 Jérémy Patinier, journalist
 José-Karl Pierre-Fanfan, footballer

Heraldry

References

External links

 Official website (in French)

Former communes of Nord (French department)
French Flanders